Gerald Arthur Nielsen (born August 5, 1966) is an American former professional baseball pitcher.

External links

1966 births
Living people
Albany-Colonie Yankees players
American expatriate baseball players in Canada
Baseball players from Sacramento, California
Birmingham Barons players
California Angels players
Columbus Clippers players
Florida State Seminoles baseball players
Fort Lauderdale Yankees players
Major League Baseball pitchers
Midland Angels players
New York Yankees players
Oneonta Yankees players
Prince William Cannons players
Sacramento City Panthers baseball players
Vancouver Canadians players